The Shepherd of the Hills is a 1928 American silent drama film directed by Albert S. Rogell and starring Alec B. Francis, Molly O'Day and John Boles.

Cast
 Alec B. Francis as David Howitt, The Shepherd
 Molly O'Day as Sammy Lane
 John Boles as Young Matt
 Matthew Betz as Wash Gibbs
 Romaine Fielding as Old Matt
 Otis Harlan as By Thunder
 Joseph Bennett as Ollie
 Maurice Murphy as Little Pete
 Edythe Chapman as Aunt Mollie
 Carl Stockdale as Jim Lane
 Ena Gregory as Maggie
 John Westwood as The Artist

References

Bibliography
 Munden, Kenneth White. The American Film Institute Catalog of Motion Pictures Produced in the United States, Part 1. University of California Press, 1997.

External links

 

1928 films
1928 drama films
1920s English-language films
American silent feature films
Silent American drama films
American black-and-white films
First National Pictures films
Films directed by Albert S. Rogell
1920s American films
English-language drama films